Mosolovo, may refer to:
Mosolovo, Kaluga Oblast, a village in Kaluga Oblast, Russia
Mosolovo, Kursk Oblast, a village in Kursk Oblast, Russia
Mosolovo, Penza Oblast, a village in Penza Oblast, Russia
Mosolovo, Starozhilovsky District, Ryazan Oblast, a village in Ryazan Oblast, Russia
Mosolovo, Shilovsky District, Ryazan Oblast, a village (selo) in Ryazan Oblast, Russia
Mosolovo, Safonovsky District, Smolensk Oblast, a village in Smolensk Oblast, Russia
Mosolovo, Kholm-Zhirkovsky District, Smolensk Oblast, a village in Smolensk Oblast, Russia
Mosolovo, Tver Oblast, a village in Tver Oblast, Russia
Mosolovo, Zaoksky District, Tula Oblast, a village in Tula Oblast, Russia
Mosolovo, Suvorovsky District, Tula Oblast, a village in Tula Oblast, Russia